Babru is an Indian Kannada language film, directed by Sujay Ramaiah. Poornachandra Tejaswi has composed music for the film. It stars Suman Nagarkar, Mahi Hiremath, Sunny Moza, Ray Tostado and Prakruthi Kashyap in lead roles. It is jointly produced by Suman Nagarkar Productions and Yuga Creations. It is the first Kannada movie to be made completely in the United States. and is also a comeback movie for Suman Nagarkar in a lead role. It was released on 6 December 2019

Plot 
The movie revolves around two strangers, Arjun and Sana, who meet at a car rental and bond over their common language, Kannada. Circumstances lead to them sharing a car, and what follows is a road trip filled with unexpected events.

Cast 
 Suman Nagarkar as Sana/Srishti
 Mahi Hiremath as Arjun
 Sunny Moza as Fedrico
 Ray Tostado as Gustavo 
 Prakruthi Kashyap as Maya and Diya
 Lauren Spartano as Valerie
 Gaana Bhat as Carla
 Sandeep Belliyappa as Gacha
 Suresh Bhat as Don Marco
 Bharat Shripad as Hari

Soundtrack

Five songs in movie and music is composed by Poornachandra Tejaswi. Spanish music composer Carla Veronica Gonzalez compose "Soledad".

Reception 
Most of the reviews of the film speak about its climax, the cinematography and the use of drones videography for showcasing the landscape of the United States.

References

External links
 

2019 films
2010s Kannada-language films